Robert Kraus (June 21, 1925 – August 7, 2001) was an American children's author illustrator, cartoonist and publisher. His successful career began early at the New Yorker, producing over hundreds of cartoons and nearly two dozen covers for the magazine over 15 years. Afterwards, he pivoted his career to children's literature, writing and illustrating over 100 children’s books and publishing even more as the founder of Windmill Books Publishing House. His body of work is best remembered for depicting animal heroes who always try their best and never give up, which were ideals important to him at an early age.

Biography

Personal 
Robert Kraus was born in Milwaukee, Wisconsin in 1925 to parents Jack, who was in the real estate business, and Esther (Rosen) Kraus. His mother nurtured lessons in him that appear as important themes in Kraus’s later written work in the children’s literature genre. He graduated from Milwaukee’s Layton School for the Arts in 1942 and the Arts Student League of Manhattan, NY in 1945. During that time, Kraus was excluded from the military during WWII because of vision problems. He met his wife, Pamela Vivienne (formerly Nee Evan-Wong), while at the Arts League and they were married on December 11, 1946. Together they had two sons, Bruce and Bill.  In 1965, he moved into the 1865 Colonial Revival House in Ridgefield, Connecticut on the corner of Main Street and Branchville Road where he was often seen in the community walking his pug, Hoover.

Early career 
At age 10, Kraus won a cartoon contest from his local paper the Milwaukee Journal. By age 12, he was hired by that same journal to contribute a weekly cartoon entitled "Public Nuisances."  At age 16, he made his first cartoon sale to The New Yorker, which was the most prestigious platform for cartoon prints in the nation at the time Kraus also freelanced for other publications such as Collier's, the old Life, Esquire Magazine, and The Saturday Evening Post.  He continued both his education and freelance work at the Arts Student League of Manhattan, NY until he became a full-time employee at the New Yorker on contract.

Cartoons
He became a regular New Yorker contributor as both a cartoonist and cover artist beginning in the 1950s. Kraus contributed 50 cartoons in his first year at the "New Yorker." Most of his cover art reflected his romantic idea of the City (artists' studios and supplies, a chess club, a gypsy fortune teller, the Chinese New Year parade, the Coney Island roller coaster, a grand cafe, St. Patrick's Cathedral, a fancy dress ball) and he recorded his rural surroundings in Danbury, Connecticut, with its farmer's markets and county fairs.  Many of his cartoons embodied the stereotypes of their day: drunks, crooks, convicts, pirates, clowns, mythological characters, millionaires dating floozies, big businessmen, prizefighters, etc.  An important part of his cartooning career was a multi-page spread on the New York World's Fair of 1963-64. In his 15 years at the New Yorker, Kraus produced over 450 cartoons and 21 covers. In 1983, after taking an extended break from cartooning to work on children’s literature, Kraus created a Sunday feature called “Zap! The Video Chap,” targeted at children who were growing addicted to playing video games.

Children's books
In 1954, Kraus decided to pivot his career. He began writing and illustrating children's books, beginning with Junior the Spoiled Cat, The Littlest Rabbit, The Trouble with Spider (later expanded into the Spider, Fly and Ladybug series), I, Mouse, Mouse at Sea, The Bunny's Nutshell Library, Carla Stevens' Rabbit and Skunk series, and the haunting and critically acclaimed Amanda Remembers. The book Leo the Late Bloomer, an encouraging story about making one's own pace, is a continuing legacy. He utilized his extensive network of creators from the New Yorker to team up with illustrators like William Steig and Charles Addams.

Kraus could speak directly to children without a trace of artificiality or condescension, naturally embodying both them and himself in a variety of small but plucky animal protagonists.  His stories often centered on animal heroes with humanistic qualities, teaching lessons like “never give up” and always do your best even if you don’t at first succeed,” which Kraus learned from his mother. He once explained that he wrote children’s books to console himself, encourage himself and others, and investigate problems he observed in society. The story, “Miranda’s Beautiful Dream” was inspired by the life of Martin Luther King. The book Leo the Late Bloomer, an encouraging story about making one's own pace, is a continuing legacy. Kraus once said that “the greatest compliment anyone can give you is to buy your stuff.”

Professor Paul Fry has used one of Kraus's lesser works, Tony the Tow Truck, tongue-in-cheek to teach a popular English course at Yale, Introduction to the Theory of Literature, using its hundred-word text to illustrate topics such as Hermeneutics, Semiotics, Structuralism, Deconstruction, Queer Theory and Gender Performativity.

Publishing Company 
Tapping his friendships with other New Yorker artists, Kraus launched a small publishing company, Windmill Books in 1965, publishing The Chas. Addams Mother Goose, and William Steig's Roland the Minstrel Pig, followed by Steig's Caldecott Medal-winning Sylvester and the Magic Pebble. The prestige of Windmill even attracted renowned painter Jacob Lawrence, whose Harriet and the Promised Land (with verse by Kraus) became the first children's book reviewed in the Art section of the New York Times and was recently featured in the Lawrence retrospective at the Guggenheim.  Kraus soon quit the New Yorker to run Windmill full-time, as publisher, and wrote and illustrated books for Windmill as well as for Scholastic and other publishers.  Windmill artists included Fred Gwynne (the actor), Edna Eicke, Robert Byrd, Hans Kraus (no relation), VIP (Virgil Partch) and Mischa Richter.  Windmill published a set of Norman Rockwell covers with original backstories (which Kraus  wrote in consultation with Rockwell) as The Norman Rockwell Storybook and with filmmaker Robert Flaherty produced a children's book version of Flaherty's Nanook of the North.  Windmill also pioneered "board" and "bathtub" books that doubled as toys for very small children, and dabbled in pop culture with its Elvis calendar and Encyclopedia Galactica.

In spite of its flirtations with the mass market, in the end Windmill Books proved to be more of a succes d'estime than anything else. The company struggled through legal difficulties with its distributor and was forced to sign over to Simon & Schuster in the 1980s.  Steig's best-known children's book, Shrek, was published elsewhere.  Kraus and Windmill are probably best remembered as the author and publisher of Leo the Late Bloomer, Whose Mouse Are You, Milton the Early Riser and other books beautifully and imaginatively illustrated by Jose Aruego and Arianne Dewey, as well as the seasonal favorite The Christmas Cookie Sprinkle Snitcher, illustrated by VIP. Kraus wrote stories, but his passion was drawing and illustrating—He once said, "I love drawing...Giving my stories to somebody else was like giving a way a child." In total before its sale, Windmill House had published over two hundred books on three continents.

Honors and Reception 
Reviewers from the New York Times praise Kraus’ simplistic and meaningful style and tone. In regards to his book “Old-Fashioned Raggedy Ann & Andy ABC Book,” illustrated by Johnny Gruelle, they write “Evoking nostalgia, this simple--yet elegant--dictionary is based on the-way-it-used-to-be stylized illustrations and delightful rhymes.” His stories, Whose Mouse Are You?, Milton the Early Riser, and Owliver were named notable children’s books by the American Library Association. His book Herman the Helper was a Trade Book Award Winner and appeared on the Horn Book Honor List. In the more visible public domain, his story Leo the Late Bloomer was read on national television by former First Lady Barbara Bush during her campaign to promote children’s literacy. A collection of his manuscripts are stored and preserved at Syracuse University.

End of Life 
Kraus died of heart failure in a nursing home in 2001 in Kent, Connecticut. He is buried at Fairlawn Cemetery in Ridgefield, Connecticut, and etched on his gravestone is an image of a spider, a character from one of his books. He is survived by his wife of more than 50 years, the former Pamela Vivienne Evan-Wong, of Georgetown, British Guiana, a fellow student at the New York Art Students' League, and by their two sons, Bruce and Bill and four grandchildren Parker, Jack, Margaret and Vivienne.

References

  
 
 Nakamura, ed., Something About the Author, vol.11, Gale Research, Inc. 1991177-196.----

External links
 Robert Kraus' covers for the New Yorker
 Robert Kraus Cartoons (1955-1968) at Syracuse University (primary source material)

1925 births
2001 deaths
American cartoonists
American children's writers
American publishers (people)
The New Yorker cartoonists